Kavathe-Mahankal  is a tehsil in Miraj subdivision of Sangli district in the Indian state of Maharashtra. This is famous for Mahankali Devi temple and Mallikarjun (God Shiva) Temple.  There is also a Sugar Factory, named after the same Goddess Mahankali Sugar Factory.

Kavathe mahankal is a peaceful town. Major festivals are Shivratri, Diwali, Ganesh Chaturthi, etc. In shivratri a 5-day fair takes place. Navratri (Dasara) in Mahankali Temple (Ambabai mandir) is also attended by nearby villagers. 
Kavathe Mahankal is famous for production of grapes, pomegranate, jowar, millet (bajra), maize, etc.

The day of Weekly Market in K. Mahankal is Tuesday.

Demography
Kavathe Mahankal city is the tehsil Headquarter of Kavathe Mahankal taluka of Sangli district, Maharashtra, with total 3733 families residing. The population of Kavathe Mahankal city as per Population Census 2011 is as follows:
  Males   = 8849
  Females = 8541
 Total   = 17390
 
K. Mahankal city has population of 1902  children with age 0–6 which makes up 10.94% of total population of city. Average Sex Ratio of Kavathe Mahankal city is 965 which is higher than Maharashtra state average of 929. Child Sex Ratio for the Kavathe Mahankal as per census is 894, equal to that of Maharashtra average of 894.

Kavathe Mahankal city has higher literacy rate compared to Maharashtra. In 2011, literacy rate of Kavathe Mahankal  was 87.28% compared to 82.34% that of Maharashtra. In Kavathe Mahankal,  Male literacy stands at 92.30% while female literacy rate stands at 82.13%.

Other attractions 
Being a region with mainly dry & arid climate, Kavathe Mahankal is a perfect habitat for goats & sheep. The place is famous for the meat of billy goats.

'Dhangari Ovya' (धनगरी ओव्या), which are the songs by that particular Caste.

→ Gajinrity (गजीनृत्य) is a famous dance form of the area

→ "Akhand Harinam Saptah Dnaneshwari Parayan Sohla" Haroli, completed its 90th year in 2016, which was started in 1926.
Haroli is one of the religious, irrigated sugar producing village in Kavathemahankal tehsil.

→ Kavathe Mahankal is one of the most drought prone areas of Maharashtra. But still it has a Sugar Factory. It's a paradox but that is the result of powerful politics of politicians of Sangli district

-> Beautiful Meghraja temple located just outside on east side of the city.

Educational Institutes 
New english school, IRALI
 Shrimati Sajabai Raghunathrao Shinde Sarkar Highschool, Malangaon
 Mahankali Vidyaniketan (Sugar Factory Campus)
 Shree Mahankali High School
 Kanya Prashala & Jr. college for girls 
 Nootan International School
 Nootan College of Pharmacy
 S.S.D.Ed college K.Mahankal 
 Ambika D.Ed college K. Mahankal
 Industrial Training Institute
 Chinguaai Institute of Nursing Education
 Zilha Parishad Shala Haroli Tal- K Mahankal
 PVP college of Arts, Commerce & Science, Kavathe Mahankal
 YCMOU Learning centre at PVP college Kavathe Mahankal (Open Schooling)
Gyan Bharti Shikshan Sanstha - Boys' and Girls highschool kavathe mahankal
Bhagirathiaai English Medium School Shirdhon
Sushila Vitthal Kadam Secondary English Medium School Shirdhon
 MAHANKALI VIDYANIKETAN AND JR COLLEGE, KAVATHE MAHANKAL
 Dyansagar Shikshan Sanstha's KILBIL Shishuvihar, IDEAL PUBLIC School, Adarsha Vidyaniketan

Other Important Places/ Govt. Organisations 
 K. Mahankal has Military Canteen for Pune Sub Area
 Tehsil Magistrate Court
 State Transport Depot
 Kavathe Mahankal Railway Station (Central Railway). Station Code [KVK]
 Police Station
Aadhar Hatcheries Borgaon
 Govt. Rural Hospital

Transportation  
 District HQ Sangli is 45 km by road - State Highway
 State HQ Mumbai is 400 km by road - State Highway + National Highway via Pune
 Solapur City is 150 km via State Highway
 Pandharpur City 100 km by road
 Coastal City Malvan is 250 km via Kolhapur, by road
 Nearest junction Miraj is 40 km by Road 
 Nearest railway station Kavathe Mahankal is just 10 km

References  

Cities and towns in Sangli district
Talukas in Maharashtra